Bushrod Washington James, A.M., M.D. (1836–1903) was an American surgeon, homeopathist, writer, and philanthropist who lived in Philadelphia.  He graduated from the Homeopathic College in 1857.  He served as the secretary of the Homeopathic Medical Society of Pennsylvania and later as its president.  He bequeathed US$55,000 as well as several properties in Philadelphia and Island Beach, New Jersey, to establish the Washington James Eye and Ear Institute, a free hospital for the treatment of diseases of the eyes, throat, and lungs.  He also provided three houses, books, jewels, relics, and a US$40,000 endowment to establish a library for children and the elderly, which eventually became the Bushrod branch of the Free Library of Philadelphia.  He donated land to the city of Oakland, California, for the establishment of Bushrod Park, and several plots of land to the city of Coronado, California, for the establishment of the Bushrod Washington James Institute.  He had also donated a house to the American Temperance University in Harriman, Tennessee, which became that institution's "Bushrod W. James Hall of Domestic Science for Young Ladies."
He is interred at West Laurel Hill Cemetery, Westlawn Section, Lot 284, Bala Cynwyd, Pennsylvania.

Works
 Rules for the Treatment of Asiatic Cholera Homoeopathically.  Philadelphia: F.E. Boericke, 1866.
 Improvements in Surgery.  1872.
 Report of the Bureau of General Sanitary Science, Climatology, and Hygiene.  Philadelphia: American Institute of Homeopathy, 1881.
 American Resorts: With Notes Upon Their Climate.  1889.
 Alaskana: Or, Alaska in Descriptive and Legendary Poems.  Philadelphia: Porter & Coates, 1892.
 Alaska's Great Future the Decision Regarding Bering Sea: The Decision.  1894.
 Echoes of Battle.  Philadelphia: H.T. Coates & Company, 1895.
 Alaska, Its Neglected Past, Its Brilliant Future.  Philadelphia: The Sunshine publishing company, 1897.
 The political freshman.  1902.

References

External links

1836 births
1903 deaths
American Civil War surgeons
American homeopaths
19th-century American philanthropists